Vladimir Yevgenyevich Golubev (16 April 1950 – 19 September 2022) was a Russian football coach and a Soviet football player.

International career
Golubev made his debut for USSR on 7 September 1977 in a friendly against Poland.

External links 
  Profile

1950 births
2022 deaths
Soviet footballers
Footballers from Saint Petersburg
Association football defenders
Soviet Union international footballers
Soviet Top League players
FC Zenit Saint Petersburg players
Soviet football managers
Russian football managers
FC Zenit Saint Petersburg managers